Mariia Kravtsova (born 19 September 2000) is a retired Russian group rhythmic gymnast. She is a two-time (2017, 2018) European Group All-around champion and the 2015 European Junior Group All-around champion. She retired in 2018.

She took up rhythmic gymnastics at age 3 in her hometown Omsk.

References

External links
 

2000 births
Living people
Russian rhythmic gymnasts
Sportspeople from Omsk
Medalists at the Rhythmic Gymnastics European Championships
Medalists at the Rhythmic Gymnastics World Championships
21st-century Russian women